"West Coast Poplock" is one of the most popular singles by Ronnie Hudson And The Street People and was released in 1982. Immediately adopted as an anthem by KDAY, "West Coast Poplock" has rarely left radio since its release nearly 40 years ago. It contains elements from the 1981 song "So Ruff, So Tuff", performed by Roger Troutman and co-written by himself and brother Larry Troutman. Various rappers have sampled it, from N.W.A, Snoop Dogg and Dr. Dre to Scarface and Mos Def. The song is notable for its sample in "California Love" by 2Pac featuring Dr. Dre and Roger Troutman, which was released on Death Row Records record label in 1996. Ronnie Hudson made a comeback with his album entitled Westcoastin', in which the "West Coast Poplock" was renamed to "West Coast Poplock 2020" and was re-mastered.

Legacy
West Coast Poplock was later sampled by Dr. Dre & 2Pac on "California Love". Hudson's work is featured in films including The Social Network, South Central, Chef & House Party, and various TV shows and video games such as Grand Theft Auto San Andreas.

Cultural references
In the song's lyrics, upscale car brands are mentioned: "Poplocking in Rolls-Royce, Cadillac, Lincoln and Mercedes Benz", along with notable hotel chains: "Poplocking in Howard Johnson, Sheraton, poplocking at the Holiday Inn".

California Love
The single "California Love" by 2Pac, Dr. Dre and Roger Troutman is the best-known song and most successful to sample "West Coast Poplock", reaching number one on the Billboard Hot 100 for two weeks. The chorus, "California knows how to party", was sung by Roger Troutman using his characteristic talk box and was taken from "West Coast Poplock."

Track listing
12"

In popular culture
 In 2013, Death Row Records former artist, Daz Dillinger, covered and freestyled on the song "West Coast Poplock" for his new mixtape entitled "Bacc 2 The Old School Vol.1".

Song samples

Sample credits
The song contains two samples below.

Sample use
The song has been sampled many times below.

Song appearances

 Album(s)
 2014: Ronnie Hudson - Westcoastin' (Re-mastered)

 Compilation album(s)
 1983: Victor & The Glove - Breakmixer (Part 1)
 1991: Various - Lowrider Soundtrack Volume 2
 1992: Various - West Coast Rap - The First Dynasty, Vol. 2
 1992: Various - South Central (Music From The Original Motion Picture Soundtrack)
 1993: Various - Compton's Greatest Rap Volume 1
 1994: Various - Old School Volume 5
 1995: Various - Eazy-E & Posse
 1996: Various - Street Jams : Back 2 The Old Skool Part Three
 1997: Various - The Best Of Old School Funk Vol. 02
 1997: Various - West Coast Posse 2

 1998: Various - Funky Break Essentials 2
 2002: Various - Old School Funkin' Hip Hop 2
 2002: Various - Hip Hop Most Wanted - Chapter 2
 2004: Various - Grand Theft Auto: San Andreas: Official Soundtrack
 2004: Various - Grand Theft Auto San Andreas: Official Soundtrack Box Set
 2005: Various - The 2Pac Collection
 2006: DJ Riz - Live From Brooklyn, Volume 2 (A Side)
 2008: Various - Old School Jams 8
 2008: Various - Gold Digging - As Sampled By 2Pac
 2008: DJ Git Hyper - DJ Git Hyper Presents Music From Raymann Is Laat!

See also
 Grand Theft Auto: San Andreas soundtrack

References

External links
 Full lyrics of Ronnie Hudson's "West Coast Poplock" cover at Rap Genius
 
 West Coast Poplock by Ronnie Hudson & The Street People at WhoSampled

1982 singles
Songs

West Coast hip hop
Funk songs
Songs written by Roger Troutman
Songs written by Larry Troutman
1982 songs